Pratt USD 382 is a public unified school district headquartered in Pratt, Kansas, United States.  The district includes the communities of Pratt, Iuka, Preston, and nearby rural areas.

Schools
The school district operates the following schools:
 Pratt High School
 Liberty Middle School
 SW Elementary School
 Early Childhood Center (PreK)
 Pratt Learning Center

See also
 Kansas State Department of Education
 Kansas State High School Activities Association
 List of high schools in Kansas
 List of unified school districts in Kansas

References

External links
 

School districts in Kansas